Marie Kean (27 June 1918 – 29 December 1993) was an Irish actress of stage and screen whose career spanned over 40 years. The Stage called her one of Ireland's most impressive actresses, and "an artist of considerable emotional depth and theatrical command."

Life 
Kean grew up in the village of Rush, County Dublin, and was educated at Loreto College, North Great George's Street, Dublin. She learned her craft at the Gaiety School of Acting and was part of the Abbey Theatre company until 1961.
 
Kean's leading role as the kindly matriarch Mrs. Kennedy in the Radio Éireann serial drama The Kennedys of Castleross made her famous throughout Ireland. She starred in the programme for the duration of its 18-year run.

In 1968, Kean won a Jacob's Award for her performance as Winnie in RTÉ television's production of Samuel Beckett's play Happy Days, a role she had performed on stage and which she described later as her favourite part. Among her other television roles was that of Mrs. Conn Brickley, Bridget's mother, in an episode of the Irish RM titled "The Boat's Share".

Kean's many stage appearances include performances in the plays of Synge, O'Casey and Friel. She had the lead role of Maggie Polpin in the 1969 world première of John B. Keane's play Big Maggie at the Cork Opera House In 1978 she won the State of New York best actress award for her performance in what has become Keane's most successful play.

Arguably her most memorable film role was as Barry's scheming mother in Stanley Kubrick's Barry Lyndon. She also played a bigoted Irish shopkeeper in David Lean's Ryan's Daughter. Her final movie appearance was in John Huston's The Dead (1987), in which she played the part of Mrs. Malins.

Marie Kean died in Donnybrook, Dublin at the age of 75. Her husband William Mulvey predeceased her in 1977.

Filmography

References

External links

Marie Kean at Irish Playography

1918 births
1993 deaths
Abbey Theatre
Irish stage actresses
Irish film actresses
Irish soap opera actresses
Irish radio actresses
Irish television actresses
Jacob's Award winners
People from Fingal
20th-century Irish actresses
Actresses from County Dublin